Scott Meredith, born Arthur Scott Feldman (1923, New York City, NY – 1 July 1992, Manhasset, NY) was a prominent American literary agent, and founder of the Scott Meredith Literary Agency. His clients included famous and successful writers such as Richard S. Prather, Morris West, Norman Mailer, J. G. Ballard, Arthur C. Clarke, P.G. Wodehouse and Philip K. Dick.

He wrote some short fiction himself as a young man. In 1946 he founded the Scott Meredith Literary Agency with his brother, Sidney Meredith. Their first client was P.G. Wodehouse. During Scott Meredith's career, he innovated many of the basic practices of his field. Such innovations included attention to foreign rights, tie-ins with movies, and auctioning rights to publishers.

His book Writing to Sell was praised by Richard S. Prather.

References

External links
 
 Scott Meredith Literary Agency

1923 births
1992 deaths
Literary agents
American short story writers